The Roman Catholic Relief Act 1793 (33 Geo. III c.21) is an Act of the Parliament of Ireland, implicitly repealing some of the Irish Penal Laws and relieving Roman Catholics of certain political, educational, and economic disabilities.

The Act was introduced by the Chief Secretary for Ireland, Robert Hobart, two years after the Roman Catholic Relief Act 1791, an Act of the Parliament of Great Britain. The Irish Act included certain local provisions such as allowing Catholics to take degrees at Trinity College Dublin. Catholic schools had already been permitted again by the Catholic Relief Act 1782, subject to the teachers taking the Oath of Allegiance and obtaining a license from the local Church of Ireland bishop. The 1793 act abolished many of the restrictions of the 1704 Popery Act and replaced others with less onerous ones. The act also repealed the provisions of the Disfranchising Act 1728, which had prohibited Catholics from voting in elections to the Irish House of Commons. However, it did not remove the terms of the parliamentary oath which prohibited Catholics from sitting in the Parliament of Ireland; section 9 of the 1793 act gave a long list of offices in the Dublin Castle administration for which the existing oaths, anathema to Catholics, remained obligatory. This was superseded by the Roman Catholic Relief Act 1829, an act of the Parliament of the United Kingdom of Great Britain and Ireland (the kingdoms having been joined in 1801 by the Acts of Union 1800). Section 12 of the 1829 act had a much shorter list of excluded offices, in particular allowing Catholic MPs.

Repeal
Section 8 of the 1793 act, allowing Catholics to be professors at the Royal College of Physicians of Ireland, was superseded by an 1800 act allowing all Christians. Other restrictions introduced in 1793 were virtually repealed or superseded by the 1829 act. Particular sections were later explicitly repealed repealed as follows:

The whole act was repealed in United Kingdom law (as regards Northern Ireland) by the Statute Law Revision Act 1953 (passed by Westminster rather than Stormont). It was repealed in Republic of Ireland law by the Statute Law Revision Act 1983.

Sources
 
 
 33 George III c.21 from The statutes at large, passed in the Parliaments held in Ireland

Citations

Acts of the Parliament of Ireland (pre-1801)
1793 in law
1793 in Ireland
Penal Laws in Ireland